A bureau à gradin is an antique desk form resembling a writing table with, in addition, one or several tiers of small drawers and pigeonholes built on part of the desktop surface.  Usually the drawers and pigeonholes directly face the user, but they can also surround three sides of the desk, as is the case for the Carlton house desk form. A small, portable version is a bonheur du jour.

In some cases the bureau à gradin has a second tier of drawers under the work surface, and thus looks like an advanced form of the bureau Mazarin or like a non-enclosed version of the cylinder desk, or the tambour desk.

See also the List of desk forms and types.

References 

Souchal, Genevieve.  French Eighteenth Century Furniture.  Translated by Simon Watson Taylor.  London:  Weidenfeld and Nicolson, 1963.
De Reyniès, Nicole.  Le Mobilier Domestique:  Vocabulaire Typologique.  Paris: Ministère de la Culture et de La Communication, 1987.

Desks
History of furniture

de:Sekretär (Möbel)